Sir John Dominic Battle,  (born 26 April 1951) is a British Labour Party politician, who was the Member of Parliament (MP) for Leeds West from 1987 to 2010.

Early life
Battle was born in Bradford and educated at St. Paulinus' School, a primary school in Dewsbury; St Michael's College, Underley Hall 1962–1967 (a junior seminary – secondary education – for the training of priests at the Roman Catholic Archdiocese of Liverpool), and at St Joseph's College, Up Holland (1967–1972). Following a year of work, he went to the University of Leeds where he graduated with a bachelor's degree in English in 1976. From 1976 to 1979, he undertook postgraduate research.

In 1979, he began to work as a research assistant to Derek Enright, a fellow Catholic and a Member of the European Parliament. Battle gained a seat on the City of Leeds Council in 1980. He chaired the innovative Industry and Employment Committee and later the Housing Committee.

He was chosen to contest the Conservative seat of Leeds North West at the 1983 general election. Donald Kaberry, the Conservative MP since the seat's creation in 1955, was retiring. John Battle lost to a sitting MP in Keith Hampson, whose own seat of Ripon had been abolished.

Battle became the national coordinator for Church Action on Poverty in 1983 and in 1986, was selected to contest the seat of Leeds West, which had seen a shock result at the previous general election. Joseph Dean had been comfortably re-elected as the Labour MP for Leeds West at the 1979 general election, with a majority of over 10,000 votes. However, in 1983 he was defeated by the Liberal candidate Michael Meadowcroft against all predictions; as Leeds West had been held Labour since 1945.

Parliamentary career
Against the national swing, Battle won fairly easily and regained the Leeds West constituency for Labour. Meadowcroft only served one term in Parliament.

Within a year of entering the House of Commons, Battle was promoted to the Opposition Whip's Office by Neil Kinnock in 1988, but resigned in protest at Labour's support for the Major ministry over the 1991 Gulf War. After the 1992 general election, he joined the frontbench of the new Labour Party leader, John Smith as a spokesman on Housing. Following Smith's death and the election of Tony Blair as Leader of the Labour Party in 1994, Battle was moved in a reshuffle to the position of Spokesman on Science and Technology. In 1995, he was moved again; this time to the position of Spokesman on Energy.

Following the 1997 general election, Battle entered the government becoming Minister of State at the Department of Trade and Industry with responsibility for Science, Energy and Industry, announcing the decommissioning of the nuclear power station at Dounreay in 1998. In 1999, he moved sideways to the Foreign and Commonwealth Office, but was dropped from government after the 2001 general election. Subsequently, he served on the International Development Committee. In 2002, Battle became a Member of the Privy Council and was the Prime Minister's envoy to all the faith communities until May 2010.

On 27 June 2009, Battle was invested as a Knight Commander with Star of the Order of St Gregory the Great (KC*SG) by Pope Benedict XVI, in recognition of lifelong commitment and loyalty to the local Church and for Battle's political contribution as a Member of Parliament. He was knighted in the 2022 New Year Honours for political and public service.

Personal life
A devout Roman Catholic, Battle is staunchly anti-abortion, he is pro-Nationalist regarding Northern Ireland, and has been a long-standing champion of East Timor.

Family
He married Mary Meenan in 1977, who is of Irish Catholic extraction and who was a Mathematics researcher at the University of Leeds, where they met at the University Catholic chaplaincy. 
They have a son (born ca. 1980) and two daughters. One of his daughters graduated from the University of Leeds in Mathematics and Finance. 

His brother, Jim Battle, was the Deputy Leader of Manchester City Council from 2004–2013 and then took up the position of Deputy Police and Crime Commissioner for Greater Manchester.

Affiliations
Battle is a Fellow of Blackfriars Hall, University of Oxford, and a patron of the International Young Leaders Network. He serves as Pro-chancellor of Leeds Trinity University.

References

External links

Guardian Unlimited Politics – Ask Aristotle: John Battle MP
 TheyWorkForYou.com – John Battle MP
BBC Politics
 BBC report, June 2007

1951 births
Living people
Alumni of the University of Leeds
English Roman Catholics
Fellows of Blackfriars, Oxford
Labour Party (UK) MPs for English constituencies
Members of the Privy Council of the United Kingdom
Politicians from Bradford
UK MPs 1987–1992
UK MPs 1992–1997
UK MPs 1997–2001
UK MPs 2001–2005
UK MPs 2005–2010
Knights Commander with Star of the Order of St. Gregory the Great
Councillors in Leeds
Knights Bachelor
Politicians awarded knighthoods
People associated with Leeds Trinity University